Changing Rooms is a do-it-yourself home improvement show broadcast in the United Kingdom on the BBC between 1996 and 2004. The series was revived on Channel 4 in 2021.

The show was one of a number of home improvement and lifestyle shows popular in the late 1990s and early 2000s. The show was later franchised, generally under the same name, for the local TV markets in the United States, New Zealand and Australia.

Format
The premise of the show was for couples to swap houses with friends or neighbours with each pair decorating one room in each other's homes. This leads up to a finale with both couples seeing their rooms, and meeting up again – almost invariably on still friendly terms. With the show including some top designers, their ideas could be a little over the top, which led to a few tears and tantrums.

History
The show began on BBC Two, at 9pm on 4 September 1996, before transferring to BBC One for the start of the third series in 1998. The final edition was broadcast on 22 November 2004 after a successful 8-year, 17 series run. The cancellation was announced on 27 August 2004.

Changing Rooms was originally hosted by Carol Smillie, and assisting with the remodelling was a Cockney carpenter, "Handy" Andy Kane. The former designer on the show, Laurence Llewelyn-Bowen, took over presenting the show from Smillie in 2003 for series 14 and 15. "Handy" Andy went on to host his own DIY shows.

In November 2004, a special episode was taped in Boscastle, Cornwall, for Christmas broadcast. Designers Anna Ryder Richardson, Graham Wynne and Gordon Whistance took on the task of restoring the decor of homes and businesses damaged in the floods of August that year. The episode was broadcast on 28 December 2004.

In October 2020, Channel 4 announced that it would be reviving the show, with Llewelyn-Bowen returning as presenter alongside Davina McCall. On 22 March 2021, it was confirmed that McCall would not present the revived series due to scheduling conflicts and the delayed filming of the show as a result of coronavirus restrictions. On 5 May 2021, Anna Richardson was confirmed as McCall's replacement.

Designers
The designers on the original version during its run included:

Linda Barker
Oliver Heath
Michael Jewitt
Rowena Johnson
Laurence Llewelyn-Bowen
Laura McCree
Anna Ryder Richardson
Liz Wagstaff
Gordon Whistance
Graham Wynne

Jordan Cluroe
Russell Whitehead

Disasters

In one episode in series 8, a Linda Barker room was being built in Wandsworth to accommodate a large collection of teapots. Overnight, the shelves collapsed, demolishing the valuable collection.

The show gained popularity through the sometimes unusual designs of Llewelyn-Bowen and the reactions of some participants who disliked their newly designed rooms. Famously, one room of Llewelyn-Bowen's was decorated entirely in animal prints on the advice of the neighbours. The visibly upset homeowners described it as resembling "a tart's boudoir" and pointed out that the neighbours, also friends, had known of their dislike of animal prints but had suggested them to Llewelyn-Bowen as a joke.

In another famous episode, Anna Ryder Richardson designed a room for a couple where she placed framed erotic French undergarments around the room. On entering the room, the woman screamed aloud and shouted, "Why would I want this shit in my room?! I've got children!" and burst into tears. Richardson apparently blushed brightly.

In another episode, after a room had been designed, it had to be redesigned because the owner of the room missed her old fireplace.

International versions
The show has been franchised and variations of it appear in several other countries, sometimes with a different name – such as Trading Spaces in United States. The original Changing Rooms is also broadcast overseas, for example, on BBC America and featured in various US shows, the Sex and the City episode "Lights, Camera, Relationship" being one example.

A New Zealand edition of the show was produced for several years, also called Changing Rooms. It was identically formatted to the British series, with host Kerry Smith, "Handy" Andy Dye, and regular designers including Donald Grant Sunderland, Neil McLachlan and Sally Ridge. A handful of international shows were produced, each featuring one couple in New Zealand and one in the United Kingdom.

Australia's Nine Network also produced a local version of Changing Rooms from 1998 to 2005, hosted by Suzie Wilks who was assisted by Peter Everett, James Lindsay, Catherine Morton and Tim Janenko-Panaeff. The show is being revived by Network Ten in 2019.

In the Netherlands a Dutch version - In Holland staat een huis - was broadcast by RTL4 from 1998 to 2006, hosted by Martijn Krabbé. In 2022 it will be revived on SBS6.

Transmission guide

Original series

Revived series

Specials

See also
DIY SOS
60 Minute Makeover
The Great Interior Design Challenge
Trading Houses

References

External links

1996 British television series debuts
2022 British television series endings
BBC Television shows
British television series revived after cancellation
Channel 4 original programming
English-language television shows
Home renovation television series
Makeover reality television series
Television series by Banijay